Garcinia multiflora is a tree species in the family Clusiaceae.  No subspecies are listed in the Catalogue of Life.

It is called dọc in Vietnamese and used to flavour and colour bún riêu soup.

References

External links 
 

multiflora
Trees of Vietnam
Flora of Indo-China